Streptomyces griseorubiginosus is a bacterium species from the genus of Streptomyces which has been isolated from soil in Russia. Streptomyces griseorubiginosus produces arylsulfatase, biphenomycin A, cinerubin A and cinerubin B.

See also 
 List of Streptomyces species

References

Further reading

External links
Type strain of Streptomyces griseorubiginosus at BacDive – the Bacterial Diversity Metadatabase

griseorubiginosus
Bacteria described in 1958